Dorcadion albanicum is a species of beetle in the family Cerambycidae. It was described by Heyrovsky in 1934. It is known from Albania.

References

albanicum
Beetles described in 1934